Dideh Banki (also Romanized as Dīdeh Bānkī; also known as Dīdābungi, Dīdeh Bāngī, Kalāt-e Dīdeh Būngī, and Kalāt-e Dīdeh Būnjī) is a village in Baghestan Rural District, in the Central District of Bavanat County, Fars Province, Iran. At the 2006 census, its population was 293, in 76 families.

References 

Populated places in Bavanat County